The North Bank Bridge (sometimes North Bank Pedestrian Bridge) is a pedestrian and bicycle path bridge in Cambridge, Massachusetts. It connects the Cambridge portion of North Point Park with Paul Revere Park in nearby Charlestown on the northern side of the Charles River.

Description
The bridge leaves the ground from near the northeast corner of the Cambridge part of North Point Park (other parts of which are within the municipal boundaries of Boston). It crosses the MBTA Commuter Rail tracks leading into North Station, crosses the Millers River, and goes under the highway lanes of the Leverett Connector. It lands on small parcel of mainland on the east side of the Millers River that lies within Cambridge. Here it connects with paths that lead into Paul Revere Park in Charlestown.

History
The state-owned bridge opened in 2012.

References

External links
 

2012 establishments in Massachusetts
Bridges completed in 2012
Bridges in Massachusetts
Buildings and structures in Cambridge, Massachusetts
Pedestrian bridges in Massachusetts